Molenlanden is a municipality in the province of South Holland in the Netherlands. The municipality was created on 1 January 2019 by merging the municipalities of Giessenlanden en Molenwaard. It is located east of Rotterdam along the Lek. The World Heritage site of Kinderdijk is in the gemeente. Its largest population centers are Nieuw-Lekkerland and Giessenburg.

The municipality includes the settlements of Arkel, Bleskensgraaf, Brandwijk, De Donk, Gelkenes, Gijbeland, Giessen-Oudekerk, Giessenburg, Goudriaan, Graafland, Groot-Ammers, Hofwegen Hoogblokland, Hoornaar, Kinderdijk, Kooiwijk, Langerak, Liesveld, Molenaarsgraaf, Nieuw-Lekkerland, Nieuwpoort, Noordeloos, Ottoland, Oud-Alblas, Schelluinen, Streefkerk, Vuilendam, Waal, and Wijngaarden.

References

 
Alblasserwaard
Municipalities of South Holland
Municipalities of the Netherlands established in 2019